Tamatoa III (c. 1757 – 1831) was the King of Raiatea from 1820 to 1831.

U'uru, or Vetea-ra'i-'u'uru, was the son of Tamatoa II by his third wife.  He was the ari'i maro 'ura, high chief, at 'Opoa on Raiatea, during Captain James Cook's visit in 1773.

Family

References 

French Polynesian royalty
Raiatea
Oceanian monarchs
People from Raiatea
1831 deaths
Year of birth uncertain
Converts to Protestantism from pagan religions